Jack is the twentieth studio album by Australian singer John Farnham. The album was released in Australia on 15 October 2010, and supported by a series of performances, John Farnham Live!. The album has seven new tracks and four cover versions of tracks by Eddy Arnold, Percy Sledge, Jerry Vale, Curtis Mayfield and Ray Charles. It peaked at No. 2 on the ARIA Albums Chart and, at the end of the year, it was certified gold by ARIA for shipment of 35000 copies.

The first single from the album, which made its digital and analogue radio debut on 24 September 2010, is "Hit the Road Jack"/"Fever" medley. Farnham performed it live on TV programme, The Footy Show (AFL). A teaser trailer for the album was posted to his official web site, and YouTube Channel on 23 September 2010.

Reception
 

Jon O'Brien from AllMusic rated Jack at two-and-a-half stars out-of five and observed, "Rejuvenated by his show-stopping duet with Coldplay at 2009's Sound Relief, Australia's most successful solo artist John Farnham, returns for his first new studio album in five years... [and] sees the former teen pop idol and Little River Band frontman embrace a previously hidden swing-blues side for the first time in his 40-year career." adding "overall, Farnham ... just isn't the right one to sing these types of songs, while its hodgepodge of busily arranged covers and limp original efforts ensures that Jack is a lackluster comeback that fails to build on his recent credible endorsements."

Track listing

Charts

Weekly charts

Year-end charts

Certifications

References

2010 albums
John Farnham albums